El Eje is a village and municipality in Catamarca Province, Belén Department, in northwestern Argentina.

References

Populated places in Catamarca Province